Lion FC is an association football club in Cambodia. It plays in the C-League, the top division of Cambodian football.

Football clubs in Cambodia